Laevicardium, common name "egg cockles", is a genus of saltwater clams or cockles, marine bivalve molluscs in the family Cardiidae, the cockles.  They are unusual among the cockles in that they have smooth, rounded, "egg-like" valves.

Species
There are 33 species in Laevicardium:
 Laevicardium attenuatum
 Laevicardium biradiatum
 Laevicardium brasilianum
 Laevicardium castaneum
 Laevicardium clarionense
 Laevicardium compressum
 Laevicardium crassum (Gmelin, 1791) — Norwegian egg cockle
 Laevicardium decorticatum
 Laevicardium elatum (Sowerby, 1833) — Giant egg cockle
 Laevicardium etheringtoni
 Laevicardium gorgasi
 Laevicardium laevigatum (Linnaeus, 1758) — egg cockle
 Laevicardium leptorimum
 Laevicardium lobulatum
 Laevicardium lyratum
 Laevicardium mortoni (Conrad, 1830) — Morton's egg cockle
 Laevicardium multipunctatum
 Laevicardium nemo
 Laevicardium nemocardiforme
 Laevicardium oblongum
 Laevicardium parisiense
 Laevicardium parkinsoni
 Laevicardium pedernalense
 Laevicardium pictum (Ravenel, 1861) — Ravenel's egg cockle
 Laevicardium pristis
 Laevicardium rudentis
 Laevicardium serratum
 Laevicardium substriatum
 Laevicardium sybariticum (Dall, 1886) — Dall's egg cockle
 Laevicardium tegalense
 Laevicardium tenuisulcatum
 Laevicardium tertium
 Laevicardium tristiculum
 Laevicardium venustulum

References

Cardiidae
Bivalve genera